Jasper Mall is an enclosed shopping mall located in Jasper, Alabama, United States, approximately  west of Birmingham.

History
The mall opened on August 8, 1981.

Originally developed by the local Simmons family and Georgia developer George Ewing, the mall is owned by Kohan Retail. Anchor JCPenney moved from downtown to the mall when it opened.  The local paper has reported that it is unusual for a mall to have Kmart as an anchor.

Sharp Development Group, led by Sam Sharp, purchased the mall from Jasper Mall Associates in 1996.

Third anchor Belk opened an approximately  store in March 2002.  This was part of an  expansion of the mall by Sharp Realty.

On December 28, 2016, Sears Holdings announced that Kmart would be closing as part of a plan to close 30 Sears and Kmart stores nationwide. The store closed in March 2017.

On March 17, 2017, it was announced that the JCPenney store would also be closing as part of a plan to close 138 locations. The store closed its doors permanently on July 31. 

On January 24, 2020, Jasper Mall, a documentary feature film billed as "a year in the life of a dying shopping mall, its patrons, and its tenants" premiered at Slamdance Film Festival.

On November 12, 2021, Dunham's Sports opened in the former JCPenney anchor location on the east end of the mall, acquiring the entire JCPenney space. Upon this event, the mall effectively has two anchor stores, Belk Department Store and Dunham's Sports.

On Tuesday January 17, 2023, the Jasper City Council approved an incentive package, which will allow a Rural King store to open in the former Kmart space in the Jasper Mall.

See also
Jasper Mall (film)

References

External links
 Jasper Mall official website

Shopping malls in Alabama
Shopping malls established in 1981
Kohan Retail Investment Group